Aristocrat is a Japanese street fashion that is inspired by what is thought to have been worn by middle class and higher social status Europeans in the Middle Ages, as well as the upper class in the 19th century. This fashion includes long sleeve blouses and shirts, long skirts, corsetry, trousers and dresses that are styled in a similar way for men and women, because it is centred on androgyny and elegance. Most aristocrat fashion takes heavy influence from gothic fashion. Makeup, when worn with the fashion, is on the darker side, may be heavy, and can be worn without regards to gender. 

Elegant Gothic Aristocrat (EGA) is a term coined by Mana, a fashion designer and former band leader of Malice Mizer, and is used to describe his brand of clothing carried in his store Moi-même-Moitié.

See also 
Japanese street fashion
Lolita fashion
Ganguro
Kogal
Cosplay
Visual kei
Neo-Victorian
Steampunk

References

External links
 DarkFashionLinks  - community driven alternative fashion directory.

Japanese subcultures
Japanese youth culture
19th-century fashion
20th-century fashion
21st-century fashion
Art Nouveau